Golden Salamander is a 1950 British adventure film directed by Ronald Neame and starring Trevor Howard, Anouk Aimée and Herbert Lom.  It won an award at the 1950 Locarno International Film Festival. It is based on Victor Canning's 1949 novel The Golden Salamander. about a British archaeologist in North Africa who runs afoul of a crime syndicate.

It was shot at Pinewood Studios, with sets designed by the art director John Bryan. Extensive location shooting took place in Tunisia, including the ruins of Carthage. The score was composed by William Alwyn who incorporated Arabic themes into his work. It was given an American release by Eagle-Lion the following year.

Plot
Sent by the British Museum to take charge of the shipping to London of important artefacts, David Redfern's route along an isolated Tunisian road is blocked by a landslide. During a heavy rain he makes his way to the town, but not before witnessing a gun-running operation. At the café in the town he meets Anna, a young Frenchwoman who with her brother Max had moved to North Africa during the wartime German occupation of France. Realising that Max is mixed up in the gun-running, Redfern decides to remain silent about what he has witnessed and concentrate instead on his job of removing the artefacts as quickly as he can.

As he spends time in Anna's company, Redfern falls in love with her and decides to help Max escape from the criminal existence in which he has become trapped and send him to Paris where as a talented painter he can make a fresh start. However Max is killed by his associate on the way to Tunis.

Realising that Redfern knows too much about their operations, Serafis, the head of the criminal outfit, and his henchman Rankl plan to kill him and make it look like an accident. With the help of a friend, Redfern is able to escape. Tracked by his enemies during the town's annual boar hunt, he manages to demonstrate to the authorities that the gang have murdered Max.

Cast
Trevor Howard as David Redfern
Anouk Aimée as Anna 
Herbert Lom as Rankl
Jacques Sernas as Max 
Walter Rilla as Serafis
Miles Malleson as Douvet
Wilfrid Hyde-White as Agno
Peter Copley as Aribi
Marcel Poncin as Dommic
Kathleen Boutall as Mme. Guillard
Eugene Deckers as Police Chief
Percy Walsh as Guillard
Sybille Binder as Mme. Labree
 Valentine Dyall as Ben Ahrim 
 Henry Edwards as Jeffries

References

Bibliography
  Ian Johnson. William Alwyn: The Art of Film Music. Boydell Press, 2005.

External links

1950 films
1950 adventure films
British adventure films
Films based on British novels
Films directed by Ronald Neame
Films set in Tunisia
Films shot in Tunisia
Films shot at Pinewood Studios
Films scored by William Alwyn
British black-and-white films
1950s English-language films
1950s British films